MNT (Max-binding protein MNT) is a Max-binding protein that is encoded by the MNT gene

Function 

The Myc/Max/Mad network comprises a group of transcription factors that co-interact to regulate gene-specific transcriptional activation or repression. This gene encodes a protein member of the Myc/Max/Mad network. This protein has a basic-Helix-Loop-Helix-zipper domain (bHLHzip) with which it binds the canonical DNA sequence CANNTG, known as the E box, following heterodimerization with Max proteins. Its delta signature is 44. This protein is a transcriptional repressor and an antagonist of Myc-dependent transcriptional activation and cell growth. This protein represses transcription by binding to DNA and recruiting Sin3 corepressor proteins through its N-terminal Sin3-interaction domain

Interactions 

MNT (gene) has been shown to interact with MLX, SIN3A and MAX.

References

Further reading

External links 
 

Transcription factors